The Silhouette also called the Silhouette 17, is a British trailerable sailboat that was designed by Robert Tucker as a pocket cruiser and first built in 1954.

The basic Silhouette 17 design was developed through five marks and produced for more than 30 years.

Production
Originally made available as a kit for amateur construction from plywood, later kits and finished boats were supplied by Hurley Marine in Plymouth, United Kingdom and later by Varne Marine, among other builders. Production ran between 1954 and 1986, with about 3,000 boats of all marks completed.

After drawings were published in The Rudder magazine in April 1955, some readers noted the boat's outline shape or silhouette and the boat got its name.

Design
The Silhouette 17 is a recreational keelboat, with the early models built predominantly of plywood and later ones from glassfibre, with wood trim. Boats built up until 1960 had a fractional sloop and after that, during Mk II production, switched to a masthead sloop rig. The hull has a spooned, raked stem; a raised counter, angled transom; an internally mounted spade-type rudder controlled by a tiller and twin keels or a single fixed fin keel. All versions had complex sheer lines, producing a distinctive appearance. The displacement and ballast vary by model.

The boat is normally fitted with a small  outboard motor for docking and manoeuvring, although a few models were offered with inboard engines.

The design has sleeping accommodation for two, or four people starting with the Mk IV.

Variants
Silhouette 17 Mark I
Silhouette 17 Mark II  
This model was introduced in 1958 and built from plywood until 1963, when glassfibre construction was introduced. On 1960 the previously-employed fractional rig was changed to a masthead rig. Production ran until 1966 with 1,830 boats completed.
Silhouette 17 Mark III
This model was introduced in 1967 and was a major redesign  for glassfibre construction by Hurley Marine, including a rounded hull design, a 40% increase in sail area and an optional inboard engine.
Silhouette 17 Mark IV
This model was based on the Mk III, introduced in 1974 and built until 1974, with only about 25 completed. It introduced a four berth layout.
Silhouette 17 Mark V
This model was introduced in 1974 and built by Varne Marine after Hurley went out of business and the moulds were sold.

Operational history
The boat is supported by an active class club, the Silhouette Owners International Association.

In a 2010 review Steve Henkel wrote, "best features: She probably would be among the least expensive sailboats to buy on the used market, if you could find one in reasonable condition. Worst features: Her shallow keel relatively high wetted surface keep her from being fast or weatherly ... She has the shortest waterline (slow under power), the smallest cockpit, least space below among her comp[etitor]s. Her old-fashioned hard-chine, tortured hull shape, originally dictated by the fact that she was to be built of flat sheets of plywood, give her a strange look that some would call ugly."

See also
List of sailing boat types

References

External links

Keelboats
1950s sailboat type designs
Sailing yachts
Trailer sailers
Sailboat type designs by Robert Tucker
Sailboat types built by Hurley Marine
Sailboat types built by Varne Marine